The City of Memphis is located on the eastern bank of the Mississippi River in the southwest corner of the U.S. state of Tennessee. It is the regional hub for a tri-state area of Arkansas, Mississippi and Tennessee.

Shelby County is located over four natural aquifers, one of which is recognized as the "Memphis sand aquifer" or simply as the "Memphis aquifer." This particular water source is stated to contain more than 100 trillion gallons (380 km³) of water.

Memphis has a humid subtropical climate, with four distinct seasons. The summer months are persistently hot and humid due to moisture encroaching from the Gulf of Mexico.

Geography
The city sits on the eastern bank of the Mississippi River at the site of the 4th Chickasaw Bluff, just south of the mouth of the Wolf River.

Cityscape

The city of Memphis It is the regional hub for a tri-state area of Arkansas, Mississippi and Tennessee. The city center is located on the Mississippi river at the site of the earliest settlements.

Interstate 40 enters the city from the northeast, and loops above the central part of the city, exiting across the Mississippi River and traveling to the west. Interstate 55 approaches the city from the south and connects with Interstate 240 which, along with I-40, creates the Inner Beltway. Interstate 269 is Memphis' Outer Beltway, traveling from Millington to Hernando via Arlington, Collierville, Piperton, and Byhalia. Upon completion, Interstate 69 will enter Memphis from Southaven along I-55. It will continue north on I-240 and then onto I-40, where it will branch off at SR-300 to continue north towards Dyersburg. Interstate 22 will eventually travel along US-78 from Birmingham to just outside Memphis and is expected to be named sometime in 2015.

U.S. Highway 72 leaves the city traveling to the southeast.  The west end of U.S. Highway 78 begins in Memphis on Martin Luther King, Jr. Avenue at the intersection of 2nd Street.  As it leaves Memphis, US 78 follows Lamar Avenue, historically known as Pidgeon Roost Road for the nestings of passenger pigeons formerly in the vicinity.  The east end of U.S. Highway 78 terminates in Charleston, South Carolina.

Tallest buildings

Current Geographical Boundaries
Memphis has expanded its city limits several times within the past half-century due to annexation. The current boundaries (as of December 2012) are roughly as follows:

 Mississippi River as the west boundary.
 The Loosahatchie River, Raleigh-Millington Road over to Egypt-Central Road, then bordering Bartlett, Tennessee, Lakeland, Tennessee, and Arlington, Tennessee as a north boundary over to the Fayette County, Tennessee line.
 A half mile line south of U.S. Route 64, over to Berryhill Road, Macon Road, Rocky Point Road, Walnut Grove Road to east of Forest Hill-Irene Road, south to the Wolf River and following the Germantown, Tennessee border as an east boundary.
 An irregular line including and running east of the Southwind Golf Course (see below), to Nonconnah Creek, Germantown Road, Shelby Drive, Riverdale Road, Holmes Road, Crumpler Road, to the Mississippi State line running to the river as a south boundary.

An area within those boundaries that has not been annexed by the city of Memphis is a neighborhood known as the Bridgewater area, roughly bounded by I-40 to the north, Germantown Parkway to the east, Shelby Farms to the south and Whitten Road to the west. Memphis did try to annex this area in the mid-2000s but held it off due to an inability to move services into the area.

Per Tennessee law, each county is required to set up urban growth boundaries for it cities. Because of this, Memphis (along with each suburb) has what is known as an annexation reserve that defines the eventual city limits. This annexation reserve includes an area between the Big Creek Drainage Canal up to the southern border of Millington, Tennessee and western border of Bartlett, an area between Lakeland, Arlington, Fayette County, and Collierville, Tennessee, and then a small portion of land south of the Southwind area mentioned above.

Sections and suburbs

The core of Memphis is marked by five major districts, with smaller districts lying within their borders. These are Downtown, Midtown, North Memphis, South Memphis, and East Memphis. In recent decades, the city has expanded further by annexing adjacent territories, so these names can be somewhat misleading to those who are unfamiliar to the area.

Sections and neighborhoods:

Aquifer
Shelby County is located over four natural aquifers, one of which is recognized as the "Memphis sand aquifer" or simply as the "Memphis aquifer". This particular water source, located some 350 to 1100 ft (100 – 330 m) underground, is stated to contain more than 100 trillion gallons (380 km³) of water by Memphis Light, Gas, and Water, which draws, verifies the cleanliness of, and distributes the water to over 250,000 customers.

Furthermore, in the time since the tapping of the well in 1887, the aquifer has only descended , suggesting a reliable water source in Memphis for years to come.

Most Memphians recognize this as their primary water source, and take great regional pride in their possession of the aquifer.  This includes protecting it against potential contaminants, as occurred in 2021 with the Byhalia Pipeline protests.  Memphis water is notably soft, low in mineral content, and free of toxic substances.

Climate

Memphis has a humid subtropical climate (Köppen Cfa), with four distinct seasons, and is located in USDA Plant Hardiness Zone 8, as compared to most of the state, which is located in Zone 7. Historically, April is the month with the highest frequency of tornadoes, though tornadoes have occurred every month of the year. Memphis is sunny approximately 65% of the time, with monthly percent possible sunshine ranging from 50% in December to 74% in June thru August.

Spring
Spring often begins in late February or early March, following the onset of a sharp warmup. Average rainfall is slightly higher during each of the spring months exceeds , making it the wettest season, but relative humidity is at its lowest. The average last freeze of spring falls on March 19, while the first + high can be expected on May 23.

Summer
Afternoon thunderstorms are frequent during some summers, but usually brief, lasting no longer than an hour. On average, annually there are 70 days of + highs, and 2.7 days of + highs.

Autumn
Early Autumn sees a slight reduction in relative humidity levels, but daytime temperatures remain warm into late October. Abrupt but short-lived cold snaps are common. Late Autumn is rainier and colder, with December on average recording the most rain of any month. Fall foliage becomes especially vibrant after the first frost, typically November, and lasts until early December. The average last + high of the warm season falls on September 22, while the average first freeze of autumn falls on November 14, yielding a growing season of 240 days.

Winter
Winters are mild, but cold snaps can occur; on average there are 47 days annually with a low at or below freezing, and 4.7 days with a high at or below freezing. However, from December to February, there is an average of 6.3 days of + highs. The most significant snow in many years fell on March 8, 2008 when 7 inches blanketed the city. While severe weather is more common in Spring, notable severe weather has occurred in winter. On February 5, 2008 a tornado killed 3 in Memphis during the 2008 Super Tuesday tornado outbreak.

Monthly normals and record temperatures

Sister cities

  Kanifing, Gambia
  Kaolack, Senegal

Landmarks 
  – Hernando de Soto Bridge (I-40)
  – St. Jude Children's Research Hospital
  – 100 North Main Street, Tallest Building in Memphis
  – Beale Street Visitors Center
  – Sun Studio
  – Lorraine Motel
  – National Ornamental Metal Museum
  – Graceland Mansion
  – Tennessee Brewery
35°07'33.5"N 89°57'35.6"W -- Memphis Pink Palace Museum

Notes

References